The Red Line is a light rail line in Dallas, Texas operated by the Dallas Area Rapid Transit system.

Route

Westmoreland to Downtown
The southwestern terminus of the Red Line is at Westmoreland Station in southwest Dallas at the intersection of Illinois Avenue and Westmoreland Road. The southwestern part of the Red Line runs on a private right-of-way with grade crossings. The joint Red and Blue Line tracks then rise on to a viaduct that crosses Cedar Creek, the Trinity River, and a freight railroad line. At Lamar Street, the line turns north at a wye where a pair of tracks leading to one of two train yards on the system diverges. The Red and Blue Lines continue north, crossing the Landry Freeway, travelling under the Dallas Convention Center and stop at Dallas Union Station. At this point, the lines leave their right of ways and operate on a dedicated street-running right of way.

Downtown to Parker Road
The four DART lines share a common section of track through downtown, with four stops: West End, Akard Street, St. Paul Street and Pearl Street.

After Pearl Street, street running ends and the lines return to private right-of-ways. The four lines diverge at a wye, with the Green Line diverging to the southeast while the Red, Blue and Orange Lines turn north, cross the Good-Latimer Expressway at grade, and descend into a long tunnel under the Central Expressway (US 75), with a stop at Cityplace. The lines exit the tunnel at Mockingbird. The Blue Line diverges from the Red Line and heads east, while the Red and Orange Lines turn north.

The Red Line then travels through north Dallas, Richardson and Plano. Most of the line runs at grade level with grade crossings, although portions of the route run on elevated viaducts. The line terminates at the Parker Road Station at Park Boulevard near Central Expressway in Collin County.

History
Much of the line was constructed on the former Texas Electric Railway route. That service ceased operations in 1948.

The Red Line was part of the initial launch of DART's light rail testing and service in 1996.  At the time, the line only ran from Westmoreland Station to Pearl Station in the northeast corner of downtown.  In 1997, the Red Line was extended to Park Lane Station, and was the first DART line to use the 3.5-mile twin tunnels. On December 18, 2000, Cityplace Station, the southwest's first commercial subway station was opened along the Red Line underneath Cityplace Tower in the tunnel under the Central Expressway.

In 2002, the Red Line extended into Richardson, ending at Galatyn Park Station, extending the light rail service  over its original length.  Later that year, the line was opened to the Parker Road Station, an additional  of track, its current terminus.

Expansion
The current northern terminus of the Red Line is Parker Road Station in Plano. The further north suburb, Allen, is eligible to join DART. There has been ongoing discussion of possible expansion into Allen. DART owns an abandoned railroad corridor in Allen, immediately north of Parker Road Station, in anticipation of future northbound expansion. However active Red line service is unable to expand further north because Allen is currently unable to levy the 1% sales tax required for DART membership. Allen already levies sales tax at the maximum rate of 8.25% set by Texas law. Redirecting 1% sales tax for DART membership would require scrapping funding for the Allen Economic Development Corporation and the Allen Community Development Corporation.

Stations

Daily Service
Listed from north to south

Special Event Service
 Deep Ellum Station (Served regularly by )
 Baylor University Medical Center Station (Served regularly by ) 
 Fair Park Station (Served regularly by )
 Victory Station (Also served by)

References

External links 

 Full DART System Map

Dallas Area Rapid Transit light rail lines
Passenger rail transportation in Texas
Transportation in the Dallas–Fort Worth metroplex
Railway lines opened in 1996
1996 establishments in Texas